In enzymology, a carveol dehydrogenase is an enzyme that catalyzes the chemical reaction

(-)-trans-carveol + NADP+  (-)-carvone + NADPH + H+

Thus, the two substrates of this enzyme are (-)-trans-carveol and NADP+, whereas its 3 products are (-)-carvone, NADPH, and H+.

This enzyme belongs to the family of oxidoreductases, specifically those acting on the CH-OH group of donor with NAD+ or NADP+ as acceptor. The systematic name of this enzyme class is (-)-trans-carveol:NADP+ oxidoreductase. This enzyme is also called (-)-trans-carveol dehydrogenase. This enzyme participates in monoterpenoid biosynthesis and limonene and pinene degradation.

References

 

EC 1.1.1
NADPH-dependent enzymes
Enzymes of unknown structure